Lieutenant General Sir Henry Edward Burstall,  (26 August 1870 – 8 February 1945) was a Canadian general.

Born at Domaine Cataraqui, Sillery, Quebec, the son of the wealthy merchant John B. Burstall (1832–1896) and Fanny Bell Forsyth, daughter of James Bell Forsyth, the builder of Domaine Cataraqui, in 1831. Burstall was educated at Bishop's College School and the Royal Military College of Canada in Kingston, Ontario (1887–89)(#246).

Military service

He was commissioned in the Royal Canadian Artillery in 1889.  In 1898 he served with the Yukon Field Force.  He went to South Africa with the 1st Canadian Contingent during the Boer War. From 1901 to 1902, he served with the South African Constabulary in the Transvaal. He was promoted to lieutenant-colonel in 1908 and commanded the Royal Canadian Horse Artillery in 1911.

During World War I, he was a brevet colonel and Brigadier-General in command of Artillery, 1st Canadian Division from 1914 to 1915. He was promoted to Major-General and was General Officer Commanding (GOC) of the Royal Canadian Artillery from 1915 to 1916. From 1916 to 1918, he was GOC 2nd Canadian Division. After the war, he was Quartermaster-General at Department of National Defence from 1919 to 1920. From 1920 to 1925. he was the Inspector-General. He retired in 1925, settling in England. He died in 1945 in Headbourne Worthy, Hampshire, England.  He is buried in the churchyard of St Swithun's Headbourne Worthy.

Honours
He was created a Companion of the Order of the Bath in 1915, a Companion of the Order of St Michael and St George in 1917, Knight Commander of the Order of the Bath in 1918, and Knight Commander of the Order of St Michael and St George in 1919. On 15 February 1917, Burstall was awarded the Order of Saint Stanislas, 2nd Class (with swords) by Nicholas II of Russia, and on 21 August 1919, he was the recipient of the French Croix de guerre.

The town of Burstall, Saskatchewan, incorporated as a village in 1921, is named in his honour.
Mount Burstall (2760m), which part of the Spray Range, Kananaskis Park, Alberta was named in 1918 in his honour.  Latitude 50; 46; 20 Longitude 115; 19; 30.

References

Books
4237 Dr. Adrian Preston & Peter Dennis (Edited) "Swords and Covenants" Rowman And Littlefield, London. Croom Helm. 1976.
H16511 Dr. Richard Arthur Preston "To Serve Canada: A History of the Royal Military College of Canada" 1997 Toronto, University of Toronto Press, 1969.
H16511 Dr. Richard Arthur Preston "Canada's RMC - A History of Royal Military College" Second Edition 1982
H16511 Dr. Richard Preston "R.M.C. and Kingston: The effect of imperial and military influences on a Canadian community" 1968
H1877 R. Guy C. Smith (editor) "As You Were! Ex-Cadets Remember". In 2 Volumes. Volume I: 1876-1918. Volume II: 1919-1984. Royal Military College. [Kingston]. The R.M.C. Club of Canada. 1984

External links
 

Henry Edward Burstall (1870-1945), Lieutenant-General, at the National Portrait Gallery
Portrait of Sir Henry Edward Burstall, after William Orpen, at the British Museum
Burstall, Henry E. (Henry Edward), 1870-1945 at SNAC

See also 
List of Bishop's College School alumni

1870 births
1945 deaths
Canadian Knights Commander of the Order of St Michael and St George
Canadian military personnel of the Second Boer War
Canadian Expeditionary Force officers
Canadian Knights Commander of the Order of the Bath
Commandeurs of the Légion d'honneur
People from Sainte-Foy–Sillery–Cap-Rouge
Royal Military College of Canada alumni
Bishop's College School alumni
Anglophone Quebec people
Canadian generals of World War I
Royal Regiment of Canadian Artillery officers
Canadian Militia officers
Canadian military personnel from Quebec
Burials in Hampshire